The Regiment is a nickname for the Special Air Service (SAS) unit of the British Army.

The Regiment may also refer to:
 The Regiment (TV series), British drama series produced by the BBC
 The Regiment (hip hop group), an American hip hop duo
 The Regiment (video game), a video game released in 2006

See also
 Umkosi Wezintaba, "The Regiment of the Hills", a resistance movement in South Africa in the 1800s